Morris Jerome "Marshall" Korshak (February 6, 1910 – January 19, 1996) was an American lawyer and politician who served as a Democratic member of the Illinois Senate.

Early life
Marshall Korshak was born in Chicago, Illinois on February 6, 1910. His brother was Sidney Korshak. He was raised in the then-predominantly Jewish Lawndale area and graduated from Marshall Metropolitan High School. He then went to University of Wisconsin and received his law degree from Chicago-Kent College of Law. He was admitted to the Illinois bar. He served as the Secretary to Cook County Treasurers Robert Sweitzer and later Joseph L. Gill from 1934 to 1939. He then moved to the Civil Department of the Cook County State's Attorney's office and served there from 1939 to 1947. He then entered private practice.

Illinois Senate
Korshak served in the Illinois Senate from 1951 to 1963 and was a Democrat. During his first term in the Senate, he was assigned the following committees: Education; Industrial Affairs; Judiciary; and Municipalities. He also served as a member of the Illinois Public Aid Commission and the Commission on Sex Offenders.

Post-legislative career
He then served as a trustee for the Chicago Metropolitan Samitary District and as director of the Illinois Revenue Department. In 1967, Korshak was elected City Treasurer of Chicago on Mayor Richard J. Daley's slate. As Korshak could not succeed himself as Treasurer, Daley slated Joseph G. Bertand and Bertrand was elected as Korshak's successor. Korshak died in a hospital in Chicago, Illinois.

Notes

1910 births
1996 deaths
Politicians from Chicago
University of Wisconsin–Madison alumni
Chicago-Kent College of Law alumni
Lawyers from Chicago
Democratic Party Illinois state senators
20th-century American politicians
20th-century American lawyers